Burlesque metaphor is an amusing, overstated or grotesque figure of speech, usually a comparison or examplification.

Examples

References

See also
 Figure of speech

Poetic devices
Metaphors